This list is about notable Hammarby Hockey players. For a list of all players with a Wikipedia article, see Hammarby Hockey players.

Hammarby IF Ishockeyförening, commonly known as Hammarby Hockey, is a Swedish ice hockey club originally founded in 1921 and based in Stockholm. 

They were giants in the early history of Swedish hockey, playing in the domestic top league from the birth of Swedish organized hockey in 1922 until 1957. During that period, they were crowned Swedish champions eight times (1932, 1933, 1936, 1937, 1942, 1943, 1945, and 1951) in 13 attempts. The rest of their history has been more modest, having qualified for play in Elitserien (Sweden's current top-tier league, now called the SHL) only twice.

In 2008, the team went into bankruptcy. It was immediately re-founded by supporters, being inducted into the umbrella organisation of multi-sports club Hammarby IF five years later, taking the name Hammarby IF Ishockeyförening when the legal limit had expired.

Hammarby is placed 17th in the Marathon standings for the highest division of Swedish ice hockey.

Key
List criteria:
 player has won the Swedish championships with Hammarby IF, or
 has received the honorary award Stora Grabbars Märke from the Swedish Ice Hockey Association, or
 is a member of the IIHF Hall of Fame or Swedish Hockey Hall of Fame, or
 has represented the Swedish national team while at Hammarby IF, or
 has competed in the Olympic Games or World Championships, or
 has started his senior career with Hammarby IF and later played in the NHL.

Players

References

List
Players
Hammarby IF